Norman W. Pearson is an American orchestral tuba player who is most known as the tubist with the Los Angeles Philharmonic Orchestra since 1993. Prior to his appointment with the Los Angeles Philharmonic Norman Pearson was a freelance musician in the Los Angeles area and performed regularly with the Pacific Symphony, Joffrey Ballet, Los Angeles Music Center Opera and the Los Angeles Chamber Orchestra. He attended the University of Southern California, studying under Tommy Johnson, where he received a bachelor's degree in music. He also has recorded for most of the major Hollywood motion picture and television studios. He currently teaches at the Colburn School and the University of Southern California.

References

External links 
 Los Angeles Philharmonic Official Website
 Colburnschool Faculty Profile
 USC School of Music
 Crown City Brass

American session musicians
American classical tubists
Living people
Musicians from Los Angeles
USC Thornton School of Music alumni
Classical musicians from California
21st-century tubists
Year of birth missing (living people)